Chetan Pandit is an Indian Bollywood film and television actor. He played the role of Jayaprakash Narayan in the Prakash Jha-directed film Loknayak in 2004.

Filmography

Film

Television
 Punar Vivah as Suraj Pratap Sindhia 
 Kahiin to Hoga
 Ardhangini
 Saraswatichandra 
 Tujh Sang Preet Lagai Sajna
 Kalash
 Badii Devrani
 Sher-e-Punjab: Maharaja Ranjit Singh as Jai Singh Kanheya
Barrister babu as barrister subodh chatterzee
 Porus as Vishnugupta Chanakya
 Jeena Isi Ka Naam Hai

Web series 

 Rangbaaz (2019) as Home Minister Ahlawat

References

External links
 
 

Living people
Indian male film actors
Indian male television actors
Year of birth missing (living people)
Male actors from Madhya Pradesh